Karel Liebscher (24 February 1851, Prague – 20 April 1906, Prague) was a Czech landscape painter and illustrator. His brother was the history painter Adolf Liebscher.

Biography
Liebscher displayed an early talent for drawing but, at first, did not consider that to be a practical way to earn a living. He studied engineering and took a position as an assistant with the Building Authority. After a short time, however, he came down with a nervous disorder (possibly from drinking too much coffee) that required rest and quiet. During stays at various health spas in Gräfenberg, Tábor and Letiny, he studied nature and began painting. His first illustrations were published in 1879. He enrolled at the Academy of Fine Arts Vienna in 1883 where he studied with Eduard von Lichtenfels.

Liebscher's first major exhibition took place in Prague in 1885, where he exhibited with his brother Adolf. The primary themes of his works were Czech monuments, old buildings and landscapes. He later travelled to what is now Croatia, producing images of the Mediterranean coast. Many of his illustrations were used by Jan Otto in his regular magazines (Zlatá Praha) and special edition books (Bohemia by Bedřich Bernau; Castles and Chateaux by August Sedláček).

Selected illustrations

References

Further reading
 Weitenweber, Vilém; Karel Liebscher in Zlatá Praha (Golden Prague), May 1885, Issue 19, p. 258 
 Liebscher, Karel; Zlatá Praha April 1906, Issue 29, p. 337 
 Xaver Harlas, František; April 1906, Issue 29, p. 347 Karel Liebscher in Zlatá Praha

External links

 Landscape paintings by Liebscher Galerie Národní 
  List of works relating to Liebscher at the National Library of the Czech Republic

1851 births
1906 deaths
Czech illustrators
Artists from Prague
Academy of Fine Arts Vienna alumni
19th-century Czech painters
Czech male painters
Burials at Olšany Cemetery
19th-century Czech male artists